Amblytelus inornatus is a species of ground beetle in the subfamily Psydrinae. It was described by Blackburn in 1891.

See also
Amblytelus
Carabidae

References

Amblytelus
Beetles described in 1891